The castles displayed on each map are those listed in the List of castles in England for the corresponding county.
Click on the red or green dot to display a detailed map showing the location of the castle.  Green dots represent for the most part castles of which substantial remains survive, red dots represent castles of which only earthworks or vestiges survive, or in a few cases castles of which there are no visible remains.

Bedfordshire

Berkshire

Bristol

Buckinghamshire

Cambridgeshire

Cheshire

Cornwall

Cumbria

Derbyshire

Devon

Dorset

Co. Durham

East Riding of Yorkshire

East Sussex

Essex

Gloucestershire

Greater London

Greater Manchester

Hampshire

Herefordshire

Hertfordshire

Isle of Wight

Isles of Scilly

Kent

See also 
 Maps of castles in England by county: L–W